John Wayne Airport  is a commercial and general aviation airport that serves Orange County, California, and the Greater Los Angeles area. The airport is located in an unincorporated area of Orange County, and it is owned and operated by the county. John Wayne Airport is surrounded by the cities of Irvine, Newport Beach, and Costa Mesa, although its IATA airport code and mailing address are both registered to Santa Ana, the county seat. Originally named Orange County Airport, the Orange County Board of Supervisors renamed the airport in 1979 in honor of actor John Wayne, who lived in neighboring Newport Beach and died that year. A statue of John Wayne was installed at the airline terminal in 1982.

John Wayne Airport is the sole commercial airport in Orange County. The National Plan of Integrated Airport Systems for 2011–2015 categorized it as a primary commercial service airport since it has over 10,000 passenger boardings per year. Federal Aviation Administration records say the airport had 4,584,147 enplanements in calendar year 2014, an increase from 4,450,628 in 2013. In 2014, John Wayne Airport was the second busiest airport in the Greater Los Angeles area (by passenger count) with over 9 million total passengers. , the largest airlines at John Wayne Airport were Southwest Airlines, American Airlines, United Airlines, Alaska Airlines, and Delta Air Lines.

In addition to the airline terminal, several facilities at the airport serve the general aviation and corporate aviation community. General aviation operations outnumber commercial operations. The only other general aviation airport in Orange County is Fullerton Municipal Airport.

John Wayne Airport has two runways. No widebody passenger jetliners have ever been operated into SNA in scheduled airline service.

History

The first airstrip on the grounds was constructed in 1923, when Eddie Martin signed a five-year lease with James Irvine to operate a flying school on land owned by the Irvine Company. It was purchased through a land swap by the County of Orange in 1939 and remains under the county's ownership and management.

Martin added the first hangar in 1926. In 1935 Howard Hughes staged his world speed record-setting flight from the Eddie Martin Airport.

With the opening of the Santa Ana Army Air Base in 1942, the adjacent Martin Field was temporarily closed.

After serving as a military base during World War II, the Santa Ana Army Airfield was returned by the federal government to the county with the stipulation that it remain open to all kinds of aviation uses.

In addition to continuing to serve aviation, the field became an important drag racing center. From 1950 to 1959, C.J. "Pappy" Hart and Creighton Hunter operated the Santa Ana Drag Strip, credited for being the world's first commercial drag strip, on the airport runway every Sunday, when it was closed to air traffic.

In 1964 the airport was rebuilt, with its present two parallel runway configuration, oriented 190/10 degrees magnetic. A full instrument landing system (ILS) was also installed.

In the 1950s, the only airline flights were Bonanza's few flights between Los Angeles and Phoenix, via San Diego. In 1963 Bonanza started nonstop F27s to Phoenix, and to Las Vegas in 1965; in 1967 Air California started Electra nonstops to San Francisco, 48 flights a week each way. The first scheduled jet flights were Bonanza DC-9s later in 1967.

In 1967, the  Eddie Martin Terminal was built to accommodate 400,000 annual passengers.

Nonstop flights reached Salt Lake City in 1976–77 (Hughes DC-9s), Denver in 1982 (Frontier MD-80s), Dallas/Fort Worth in 1983 (American MD-80s), Chicago–O'Hare in 1986 (AirCal 737-300s), and New York–Kennedy in 1991 (America West 757-200s).

After the Orange County Airport was renamed John Wayne Airport on June 20, 1979, the John Wayne Associates commissioned sculptor Robert Summers to create a bronze statue of "the Duke". The  statue, created at Hoka Hey Foundry in Dublin, Texas, was dedicated to the County on November 4, 1982. Today, the bronze statue is in the Thomas F. Riley Terminal on the Arrival Level.

In 1990, the Thomas F. Riley Terminal opened. The aging  Eddie Martin Terminal was replaced with a modern  facility. The new facility included 14 loading bridges, four baggage carousels, wide-open spaces and distinct roadside arrival and departure levels. In 1994, the then-unused Eddie Martin Terminal was demolished.
In the late 1990s and early 2000s, a new, larger airport was proposed for the nearby site of the then recently closed El Toro Marine Corps Air Station. However, after a series of political battles, combined with significant opposition from residents in the vicinity of El Toro, the proposal was defeated, and no new airport was built.

In 2011, additional terminal space was added and existing terminals were refreshed as part of a $543 million expansion project. A new Terminal C with six additional gates was built along with dedicated commuter gate areas in the new Terminal C and new commuter facilities in Terminal A. A new parking lot C was added along with additional support facilities such as a Central Utility plant.

In June 2020, a name change was requested, due to comments the actor made believed to be in support of white supremacy to Playboy in a 1971 interview.

In September 2020, Orange County officials have planned to end all of JSX operations at SNA on January 1, 2021, stating it is "no longer welcomed". This announcement prompted the airline to seek support from customers, encouraging them to contact the Orange County officials for reconsideration in order for the airline to continue operations at Orange County. Since December 2020, the airline has filed a lawsuit against the airport, stating that it has "refused to offer any accommodations" to the airline. It stated that the airport "discriminatorily chose" to terminate the airline's operations at SNA "in favor of two large airlines [Spirit and Allegiant Airlines]..." which the former already operates the same flights to Las Vegas, Reno, and Oakland. Shortly afterwards, the airline won a temporary restraining order, preventing the airport officials from terminating the airline's operations in which a spokeswoman said the airport will comply.

Terminals

There are 22 gates in total. The main passenger terminal, the Thomas F. Riley Terminal, is named for the late county supervisor who lobbied for the airport's expansion in the 1980s. The Thomas F. Riley Terminal is divided into three terminal areas, A, B and C, with dedicated commuter gate areas at the north end of Terminal A and south end of Terminal C.

All three terminals, A, B and C, are within the same Thomas F. Riley building and security screened passengers can move "airside" between all terminal areas. Security screening lanes exist in all three terminals adjacent to check-in. All security screening areas also have a "fast track" lane for first-class and elite frequent fliers along with full TSA Pre Check availability based on TSA defined schedules. Switching between terminals indoors before security "landside" is also possible, the check-in counter areas between all three terminals have connecting walkways to allow access between all terminals. Complimentary Wi-Fi is provided in all three terminals.

Terminals A and B
Terminals A and B were built in 1990 to replace the former Eddie Martin Terminal which was closed upon the new terminals' opening. In November 2011, Terminal A added a dedicated commuter gate area, along with refreshed gates, signage and information displays at both Terminals A and B.

Terminals A and B were designed by Gensler & Associates, Leason Pomeroy Associates, and Thompson Consultants International. They contain restaurants, bars and shops, with a themed restaurant located in the airside connecting area of both terminals. In the upper rotunda above the themed restaurant is an American Airlines Admirals Club (operating out of Terminal A) and a United Club (operating out of Terminal B). The two lounges lie adjacent to each other on the mezzanine level. Terminal A has gates 1–8, and Terminal B has gates 9–15.

Terminal C
Terminal C opened in November 2011 and added seven new gates, a dedicated commuter gate area and new eateries and retail.

Terminal C also provides a U.S. Customs and Border Protection FIS/Federal Inspection Service for international flights that do not have pre-clearance. Two arrival gates feed into the FIS and passengers once cleared exit at the south end of the Terminal C arrivals area. The FIS facility has Global Entry kiosks for registered users to shorten processing time. The FIS facility was designed by Gensler. Terminal C has gates 16–22.

Arrivals level
The Arrivals level is on the lower level of the airport and provides seven baggage claim belts, two in Terminal A, two in Terminal B and three in Terminal C. Baggage Claim 7 is for international arrivals. Immediately outside the baggage claim is the curbside arrivals pickup area. Rental car offices are between Terminal A and B baggage claim areas with most rental agencies on-site in the lower levels of the parking facility across the arrivals pickup area between Terminal A and B. Across the roadway from the arrivals pickup area between Terminal A and B is an island for public transportation, including taxis and buses.

International service
John Wayne Airport offers international flights to Mexico and Canada. The airport did not have any regularly scheduled international service up until 2010 when Air Canada began operations to Toronto, Canada. Flights from Canada complete immigration and customs formalities in Canada via United States border preclearance.

Southwest Airlines is operating international flights to Puerto Vallarta and San José del Cabo in Mexico as of March 11, 2021. Prior to resumption, it previously served flights to Puerto Vallarta from June 18, 2015, until March 2017. Southwest has also served flights to Cabo San Lucas until March 2020, alongside terminating other destinations at the time due to passenger limitations following a 1985 settlement agreement.

Canadian airline WestJet provides non-stop year round service to Vancouver since May 2011. It is also serving direct flights to Calgary; it previously served that route from June 2011 to 2013 before ending operations up until its resumption on November 4, 2021.

Air Canada also provides daily non-stop flights to Vancouver, Canada since October 2, 2021. It was set to start flights in June 2020, and then delayed to September 8, 2020, and then to May 2021, which would have marked its return to service to Orange County after 10 years. It previously operated flights to Toronto, Ontario, Canada from April 8, 2010, becoming the first-ever international airline to serve Orange County, until it ceased flights later that year.

Alaska Airlines was scheduled for international service to Vancouver in 2002. However, a stop in Seattle (or change of planes) was required shortly after launch as John Wayne Airport was not authorized for pre-clearance or international flights by U.S. agencies at the time.

Southwest Airlines' then-subsidiary AirTran Airways began a new service in June 2012 from John Wayne Airport to Cabo San Lucas and Mexico City. This was the first international service to use the new FIS in Terminal C. After its merger with AirTran was completed in 2014, Southwest continued to operate the Mexico flights under its original brand. However, Southwest then ended its service to Mexico City (MEX) from SNA in January 2017 before completely discontinuing all flights to MEX in March 2019.

Mexico's low-cost carrier Interjet began a new service in October 2012 from Orange County to Guadalajara and Mexico City. It ended both flights in July 2014; the airport officials are seeking a replacement.

Alaska Airlines began a Mexico service in October 2015. The airline began offering non-stop flights from John Wayne Airport to Los Cabos on October 8 and Puerto Vallarta on the following day, October 9. Alaska Airlines has continued this service to each airport on an every-other-day rotation. Since August 2019, the airline has discontinued flights to Mexico.

Airline officials have also been in negotiations with Mexican low-cost airline Volaris, which has applied for an Orange County slot.

Aircraft noise abatement and curfew

A 1985 settlement agreement defined the scope of operation for John Wayne Airport in how it affects the local community. The area that lies directly south of John Wayne Airport is considered a noise-sensitive area. The agreement in conjunction with a Phase 2 Commercial Airline Access Plan and Regulation controls the number of noisier operations (mainly commercial aircraft) allowed from the airport. Noise abatement enforcement is carried out with the aid of 10 permanent noise monitoring stations. These stations are placed in areas that exceed a community noise equivalent level (CNEL) of 65 dB.

The short primary runway (20R/2L), coupled with the local noise restrictions, can require a takeoff at or near full power (95–97% power). Some aircraft departing from the airport may cycle to full power while holding at the runway then release the brakes when engines are fully spooled up (short-field procedure). For 20R departures, a left turn after departure to 175 degrees allows for a passage over Newport Beach within the confines of the noise abatement profile. Departures from 2L (normally during Santa Ana wind conditions) are not affected by these noise abatement procedures. Landings almost always include full flap extensions and the use of full reverse thrust. Extension of the runway is almost impossible, as both ends are enclosed by freeways, numerous residences, and businesses requiring relocation, which is a costly endeavour.

The county prohibits commercial departures between 10:00 PM and 7:00 AM (8:00 AM on Sundays) and commercial arrivals between 11:00 PM and 7:00 AM (8:00 AM on Sundays). Exceptions can be made for an emergency, mechanical, air traffic control, or weather delay, which is beyond the airline's control.

In 2003, the settlement agreement was amended to increase operations but focused on increases only for aircraft meeting the lowest noise signatures.

Access and noise reports are published by the airport and are available to the public. These reports are generated regularly and outline curfew exceptions per carrier and overall noise impact.

John Wayne Airport has been rated as one of the nation's scariest airports. To compensate for a short runway, and to comply with local noise restrictions, small private planes are required to take off at angles of up to 20 degrees, while commercial planes often reach 25 degrees which is steeper than other airports. Maximum takeoff weight restrictions apply to some aircraft at such steep pitches; and airlines have had to halt boarding before all ticketed passengers had boarded. Passengers have referred to the airport as the USS John Wayne because the takeoffs and landings are similar to what a plane would experience aboard an aircraft carrier.

Airlines and destinations

Passenger

The following airlines offer scheduled passenger service. All international arrivals (excluding flights from destinations with U.S. border preclearance) are processed in Terminal C.

Cargo

Destinations map

Runways
The airport has multiple general aviation facilities, an airline concourse building split into three terminal areas, and 2 paved runways.

 Runway 2L/20R: , used by commercial aircraft and general aviation serving most incoming and departing traffic to the west of the airport. This runway is ILS equipped.
 Runway 2R/20L: , used by smaller general aviation aircraft and light aircraft.

General aviation

The airport is the home base for approximately 450 general aviation aircraft.
The General Aviation Master Plan adopted in the early 1990s limits John Wayne Airport to two FBOs (fixed-base operator). Effective January 1, 2021, these two fixed-base operators are Clay Lacy Aviation and ACI Jet. In addition to supporting fuel sales and other aircraft services, these companies lease facilities to flight training, charter, and aircraft maintenance businesses.
FBOs:
ACI Jet
Clay Lacy Aviation
Airport businesses	
Clay Lacy Aviation
Martin Aviation Aircraft Maintenance
HeliStream
OC Helicopters
Orange County Flight Center
Regency Air
Sunrise Aviation
Western Avionics

Law enforcement operations

Orange County Sheriff's Department

John Wayne Airport has been the main base for the Orange County Sheriff's Department's Air Support Unit since 1985 when the county's board of supervisors approved the purchase of two Hughes MD 500E aircraft nicknamed "Duke I" and "Duke II". In 1998, the OCSD traded their MD 500E helicopters for newer McDonnell Douglas MD 600N helicopters, becoming the first law enforcement agency to operate the MD 600N. These helicopters were faster, quieter, and safer than the MD 500E.

The Air Support Unit currently operates of fleet of Eurocopter AS350 AStar helicopters, with a Bell UH-1 Iroquois used for search and rescue purposes.

Costa Mesa Police Department

The Costa Mesa Police Department operated an aviation unit out of John Wayne Airport for 41 years. The division was called "ABLE" for Airborne Law Enforcement. ABLE disbanded in 2012; the unit's helicopters at the time of the disbandment were three Eurocopter EC120 Colibris.

Statistics

Top destinations

Airline market share

Annual traffic

Ground transportation

Roads and highways
John Wayne Airport is located next to the interchange between I-405 (San Diego Freeway) and MacArthur Boulevard. The airport is also near I-405's interchange with SR 55 (Costa Mesa Freeway). Heading south on MacArthur Boulevard from the airport provides access to SR 73 (Corona del Mar Freeway), which becomes the San Joaquin Hills Transportation Corridor (toll road) southeast of MacArthur Boulevard.

Bus
The airport is served by Orange County Transportation Authority ("OCTA") route 76, which runs only on weekdays from 6 am to 6 pm.

Car rental
On-site car rentals are available in the basement level of the Parking A2/B2 garages. Off-site car rental shuttles are available at the Ground Transportation Center.

Parking
The airport has four parking garages open in the main terminal area: A1, A2, B2 and C. Valet parking is available between at a drop off/pick up area Terminals A and B, and between Terminals B and C. An off-airport parking lot (Main Street Parking) is also available at 1512 Main Street in Irvine, with free shuttle service to the terminals.

Irvine iShuttle
The City of Irvine's iShuttle route A serves the airport and Tustin station. The iShuttle service runs only during weekday rush hours.

Taxis and private shuttles
Taxis and private shuttles are available from the Ground Transportation Center located outside the lower level between Terminal A and B.

Transportation network companies
Transportation network companies, Lyft, Uber and Wingz, are available. Drop-offs can be made at the departure level outside each terminal; pickups are allowed only in designated parking structure areas assigned for pickups for transportation network companies (No pickups are allowed on the arrivals or departures level.)

Accidents and incidents
On February 17, 1981, Air California (AirCal) Flight 336 (a Boeing 737-200), with 105 passengers and five crew members, was flying from San Jose, to John Wayne Airport and crashed upon initiating a go-around. The crew was cleared for a visual approach to Runway 19R while the controller had cleared a smaller plane to take off from 19R. Upon realizing that the landing aircraft might overtake the departing one, the controller ordered the flight to go around and the other aircraft to abort its takeoff, which it did. The captain of the landing Air California aircraft delayed the go-around then initiated a gear up procedure before a positive rate of climb was achieved, causing the plane to stall. The 737 then banked left at low altitude causing the left wingtip to make contact with the runway. Then the nose came down, striking the ground, and the airplane spun around and skidded down the runway before coming to rest in the margin. A fire started, but the passengers and crew exited the plane. Of the passengers, four sustained serious injuries, and 29 suffered minor injuries. The aircraft, registered N468AC, was damaged beyond repair and was written off.

On December 15, 1993, a chartered IAI Westwind business jet carrying two flight crew members and three passengers (including Rich Snyder, president of In-N-Out Burger), crashed while on approach to John Wayne Airport. All five occupants were killed in the crash. The aircraft, which departed Brackett Field, 30 miles to the north in La Verne, followed a Boeing 757 for landing, became caught in the 757's wake turbulence, rolled into a deep descent, and crashed near the intersection of State Route 55 and Edinger Avenue. The crash investigation led to the FAA requirement for an adequate period between heavy aircraft and following light aircraft to allow wake turbulence to diminish.

On February 13, 2017, Harrison Ford accidentally landed his Aviat Husky on taxiway C, to the left of runway 20L.  A Boeing 737 was holding short of 20L on the taxiway when Ford overflew them.

On June 30, 2017, a Cessna 310 twin-engine aircraft crashed short of a runway into a highway median on Interstate 405. The pilot made a mayday call shortly after taking off from John Wayne Airport and attempted to land after being cleared for emergency landing on runway 20R. Two people on board were injured in the crash.

On August 5, 2018, a Cessna 414 scheduled to land at John Wayne Airport crashed into a Staples parking lot a few blocks north of the airport in nearby Santa Ana, killing at least five people.

On January 26, 2020, a Sikorsky S-76B helicopter took off from John Wayne Airport at approximately 9:06 am PST carrying retired NBA basketball player Kobe Bryant along with his 13-year-old daughter, and 7 others bound for Camarillo Airport for a basketball event in Thousand Oaks. En route, the helicopter crashed into a hillside in Calabasas south of U.S. Route 101, killing everyone on board. The helicopter had been seen in distress under heavy fog, according to witnesses. The cause of the crash was pilot error and spatial disorientation.

On the evening of August 20, 2021, an unauthorized person bypassed security and gained access to the tarmac near Terminal C, prompting a lockdown of the airport. The suspect took control of a ground crew vehicle and drove it around before abandoning it and re-entering the terminal. Police later discovered the suspect hiding in an attic space inside the terminal and took him into custody.

Lyon Air Museum
Lyon Air Museum, founded by Major General William Lyon in 2009, is located in a hangar on the west side of the airport. It focuses particularly on World War II military aircraft and vehicles. The museum hosts the Collings Foundation, an annual flight experience program, every spring, allowing the public the opportunity to fly in a historic Boeing B-17 Flying Fortress or Consolidated B-24 Liberator. The air museum features a rotating selection of antique cars from General Lyon's personal collection every year for a limited time. Past features include a collection of the General's Duesenbergs and Packard collections.

Climate
The area around John Wayne Airport has a warm-summer Mediterranean climate (Csb) characteristic of coastal Southern California.

See also

 California World War II Army Airfields
 Santa Ana Drags

References

External links

 Official John Wayne Airport website
 Orange County Sheriff's Department John Wayne Airport Police Services
 Aerial image as of March 2004 from USGS The National Map
 
 

 
Airports in Orange County, California
County airports in California
Airfields of the United States Army Air Forces in California